Stiles or Styles may refer to:

Places
 Ezra Stiles College, a residential college of Yale University, U.S.
 Stiles, County Antrim, a townland in County Antrim, Northern Ireland, U.K.
 Stiles, Texas, U.S.
 Stiles, Wisconsin, U.S.
 Stiles (community), Wisconsin, an unincorporated community
 Stiles, Pennsylvania, U.S.

People

Surnames

Stiles
 Aeriel Stiles, American guitarist and songwriter
 B.J. Stiles (born 1933), American retired nonprofit leader
 Baxter B. Stiles (1824–1878), American politician
 Bert Stiles (1920–1944), American short story writer
 Billy Stiles (1871–1908), American outlaw
 Charles Wardell Stiles (1867–1941), American zoologist
 Chester Stiles (born 1970), American criminal
 Cyril Stiles (1904–1985), New Zealand rower (aka Bob Stiles)
 Dan Stiles, American artist and designer
 Danny Stiles (1923–2011), American radio personality
 Darron Stiles (born 1973), American professional golfer
 Edward H. Stiles (1836–1921), American politician, lawyer and writer
 Ezra Stiles (disambiguation)
 Ezra Stiles (1727–1795), American academic and president of Yale College
 Ezra C. Stiles (died 1974), American landscape architect
 Florence Ward Stiles (1897–1981), American architect and librarian
 George Stiles (disambiguation)
 George Stiles (composer) (born 1961), English composer
 George Stiles (politician) (fl. 1816–1819), American politician
 George P. Stiles (1814–1885), Justice of the Supreme Court of the Utah Territory
 Grady Stiles (1937–1992), American freak show performer
 Harold Stiles (1863–1946), British surgeon
 Henry Reed Stiles (1832–1909), American physician
 Jackie Stiles (born 1978), American basketball player
 Jason Stiles (born 1973), American football player
 Jesse Stiles (born 1978), American electronic musician, record producer, sound designer, and electronic artist
 John Dodson Stiles (1822–1896), American lawyer and politician
 John Stiles, Canadian writer
 Julia Stiles (born 1981), American actress
 Kristine Stiles (born 1947), American global contemporary art historian
 Lilian Stiles-Allen (1896–1982), British soprano of the mid 20th century
 Lynn Stiles (born 1941), former American football player, coach, and executive
 Mark Stiles (born 1948), American politician
 Nancy Stiles, American school nutrition manager and politician
 Neil Stiles, British magazine executive
 Nick Stiles (born 1973), Australian professional rugby union coach and a former player
 Nobby Stiles (1942–2020), English footballer
 Norman C. Stiles (1834–1907), American inventor
 Norman Stiles (born 1942), television writer
 Patti Stiles, actor and improvisation artist living in Australia
 Rollie Stiles (1906–2007), American baseball player
 Ryan Stiles (born 1959), American-Canadian actor and comedian
 Sarah Stiles (born 1979), American singer and actress
 Stephen Stiles (born 1935), Canadian politician
 Steve Stiles (1943–2020), American science-fiction artist and writer
 T. J. Stiles (born 1964), American writer
 Tara Stiles (born 1981), American model turned yoga instructor
 Theodore L. Stiles (1848–1925), justice of the Washington Supreme Court
 Thomas Stiles, a captain in the Royalist army
 Tony Stiles (born 1959), Canadian retired professional ice hockey player
 Victoria Stiles (born 1978), Washington, D.C. makeup artist
 Wally Stiles (born 1950), Canadian politician
 William Henry Stiles (1808–1865), American lawyer and politician

Styles
 A.J. Styles (born 1977), American professional wrestler
 Alfred William Styles (1873–1926), Australian accountant, trade unionist, and politician
 Archie Styles (footballer, born 1949), English footballer
 Darren Styles (born 1975), British record producer and songwriter
 David Styles (born 1974), birth name of Styles P, American rapper
 Edwin Styles (1899–1960), British film actor
 Frank Showell Styles (1908–2005), English writer and mountaineer
 George Styles (military officer), British bomb disposal expert
 Gordon Styles (1920–1996), former Australian rules footballer
 Gordon George Styles (born 1964), British engineer and entrepreneur
 Harry Styles (born 1994), English singer, member of One Direction
 James Styles (1841–1913), English-born Australian politician
 Joey Styles (born 1971), American professional wrestler
 Karintha Styles (born 1977), American journalist
 Kaye Styles (born 1981), Belgian singer, songwriter, and TV personality
 Keni Styles (born 1981), British pornographic actor
 Lance Styles (born 1951), Australian rules footballer
 Lena Styles (1899–1956), professional baseball player
 Lorenzo Styles (born 1974), American football player
 Mailangi Styles (born 1984), Australian rugby league footballer
 Margretta Styles (1930–2005), American nurse
 Mary Styles Harris (born 1949), African American geneticist
 Peter Styles (politician) (born 1953), Australian politician
 Peter Styles (geologist), British geologist
 Rob Styles (born 1964), English football referee
 Showell Styles, Welsh writer and mountaineer
 Stephanie Styles (born 1991), American actress, singer, and dancer
 Toy Styles (born 1974), American author, screenwriter and film producer
 Walter Styles (1889–1965), British soldier and Member of Parliament
 Wes Styles, American singer-songwriter
 William Styles (1874–1940), British sport shooter

Given names
 Stiles H. Bronson, an American politician
 Stiles O. Clements (1883–1966), American architect
 Stiles Curtis (1805–1882), Warden of the Borough of Norwalk, Connecticut
 Stiles French (1801–1881), American teacher
 Stiles P. Jones (1822-1861), American lawyer and politician
 Stiles White, American screenwriter, special effects artist, and film director

Characters
 Dr. Stiles, the main character in the video game series Trauma Center: Under the Knife
 Edgar Stiles, character on the popular drama 24
 Jason Stiles (Gilmore Girls), Gilmore Girls character
 Jo Stiles, Emmerdale fictional character
 Rupert 'Stiles' Stilinski, character from 1985 film Teen Wolf
 Stiles Stilinski, character from the 2011 television series Teen Wolf
 Tod Stiles, Route 66 television series character

See also
 Stile
 Style (disambiguation)
 Stile (disambiguation)